Tomin or Tomyn is a Slavic surname. It may refer to
Julius Tomin (born 1938), Czech philosopher
Július Tomin (Interlingua) (1915–2003), Czech author
Mikhail Piatrovich Tomin (1883–1967), Soviet lichenologist
Mykola Tomyn (born 1948), Ukrainian handball player
William Tomyn (1905–1972), Canadian politician and teacher
Zdena Tomin (born 1941), Czech novelist

See also

Tonin (name)